Ewing Lake is a lake in Stettler County Alberta, Canada.  It is southwest of the town of Stettler, about 65 km east of Red Deer.

Ewing Lake has the name of John Ewing, a pioneer citizen.

See also
List of lakes of Alberta

References

Lakes of Alberta